Late Orchestration is a live album by American rapper and producer Kanye West, released on April 24, 2006, on Mercury Records. The album features recordings of live renditions of songs derived from his first two studio albums, The College Dropout (2004) and Late Registration (2005). It was recorded at Abbey Road Studios in London, England, before an audience of 300 invited guests in September 21, 2005. West was backed by a seventeen-piece all-female string orchestra and featured guest appearances by John Legend, Lupe Fiasco, GLC and Consequence. The CD release features the full performance (12 tracks) along with an additional bonus track, "Gold Digger" (Live at AOL), and came with a DVD containing footage of the concert as well as interviews and bonus music videos for the first four singles of Late Registration.

The cover photograph (taken by photographer Andrew Meredith) is a reference to the Beatles' cover of their 1969 album Abbey Road, which features the four band members walking across a crosswalk on the well known street. The album has been cited as the most well-known instance of hip hop and classical music coming together.

Track listing
 "Diamonds from Sierra Leone" – 4:08
 "Touch the Sky"  – 4:07
 "Crack Music" – 2:48
 "Drive Slow"  – 4:34
 "Through the Wire" – 3:33
 "The New Workout Plan" – 2:53
 "Heard 'Em Say"  – 4:10
 "All Falls Down" – 3:13
 "Bring Me Down" – 3:21
 "Gone" – 4:15
 "Late" – 3:54
 "Jesus Walks" – 3:14
 "Gold Digger (AOL Sessions)"  – 3:18

Charts

Weekly charts

Certifications

References

2006 live albums
Albums produced by Kanye West
Kanye West albums
Roc-A-Fella Records live albums
Live hip hop albums
Def Jam Recordings live albums